Signal Corps Laboratories (SCL) was formed on June 30, 1930, as part of the U.S. Army Signal Corps at Fort Monmouth, New Jersey. Through the years, the SCL had a number of changes in name, but remained the operation providing research and development services for the Signal Corps.

Background
At the beginning of World War I in 1917, the U.S. Army Signal Corps opened a training facility named Camp Vail in east-central New Jersey. This facility was named after Alfred Vail, an inventor associated with Samuel F. B. Morse. Later that year, the Army established the Signal Corps Radio Laboratories at Camp Vail, devoted to research in radio and electronics. The overall installation was upgraded and became Fort Vail.

Under the direction of Col. (Dr.) George Owen Squier, the Radio Laboratories centered on the standardization of vacuum tubes and the testing of equipment manufactured for the Army by commercial firms. Experimentation was also being done on radio communications with aircraft, detection of aircraft using sound and electromagnetic waves, and meteorology. Squier had earlier made a major contribution to communications by developing multiplexing, for which he was elected to the National Academy of Sciences in 1919.

After the end of World War I, aviation communication was transferred to the Signal Corps Aircraft Radio Laboratory at Wilbur Wright Field in Dayton, Ohio. The Radio Laboratories at Camp Vail continued at a low level, centering on design and testing of radio sets, field telephone and telegraph equipment, and meteorology. The facility survived as an Army installation by the Signal Corps moving all of its schools to Camp Vail, with the consolidation named the Signal School.

In 1925, Fort Vail was renamed Fort Monmouth. Although overshadowed by the Signal School and at a reduced scale due to budget restrictions, the Radio Laboratory remained an important activity at Fort Monmouth. Developments included a variety of radios for voice and Morse code communications. Coupling capabilities in electronics and meteorology, in 1929 the Laboratory developed and launched the first radio-equipped weather balloon.

Formation 

By 1929, decline in economic conditions forced the consolidation of the Signal Corps' widespread laboratories. In the interest of “economy and efficiency,” the National Bureau of Standards moved the Signal Corps Electrical Laboratory, the Signal Corps Meteorological Laboratory, and the Signal Corps Laboratory at the Bureau of Standards to Fort Monmouth. Upon arriving at their destination, the research facilities were combined with the Radio Laboratory already at Fort Monmouth to form what became known as the Signal Corps Laboratories. In 1930, the Signal Corps transferred the Subaqueous Sound Ranging Laboratory from Fort H. G. Wright, New York to Fort Monmouth as well. On June 30, 1930, the SCL had a personnel strength of 5 officers, 12 enlisted men, and 53 civilians. Major (Dr.) William R. Blair was named Director.

The SCL was responsible for the Army's ground radio and wire communication development and for improvement of the meteorological service. The next year, this Laboratory was also made responsible for research in the detection of aircraft by acoustics and electromagnetic radiation. While the number of personnel was inadequate for major work in these many and diverse areas, Blair, the Director, was personally knowledgeable in all of them.

During the 1920s, the Army Ordnance Corps at Frankford Arsenal had made tests in detecting infrared emitted from airplane engines or reflected by their surfaces. When the SCL was formed, this work was transferred to that Laboratory. Carrying this forward, in 1931, Blair initiated Project 88, "Position Finding by Means of Light." Here "light" was used in the general sense of electromagnetic radiation, including infrared and very short-length (microwave) radio waves.

Initially, emphasis was placed on special devices with high-gain amplification for detecting reflected infrared from an illuminating searchlight. In August 1932, this equipment was used to track a blimp at a distance of over a mile. Further pursuit of active detection techniques was then abandoned because of the limit of infrared energy available from searchlight sources.

Although research continued at the SCL in the passive detection of infrared emitted from heated aircraft engines, Blair became convinced that practical detection systems would involve reflected radio signals. He was certainly influenced in this by his earlier doctoral research in this field, and he was aware of the work on radio detection at the United States Naval Research Laboratory (NRL) in Washington, D.C. In December 1930, representatives of the SCL had been briefed at the NRL on the beat-interference phenomena that they were investigating, and in 1932, an NRL report on radio interference for target-detection was passed on to the Army. It does not appear, however, that any of this information was used by Blair.

Radio-based target detection
The SCL's first definitive efforts in radio-based target detection started in 1934 when the Chief of the Army Signal Corps, after seeing a microwave demonstration by RCA, suggested that radio-echo techniques be investigated. Emphasis was placed on assessing capabilities of the existing microwave tubes, including a German-built Hollmann tube with an output at 50 cm (600 MHz), and a 9-cm (3-GHz) magnetron on loan from RCA. Neither of these devices produced sufficient power for use in detection systems.

At the time, nine wooden buildings built in 1918 housed the activities of the SCL, but the need for more space led Blair to arrange the construction of a permanent laboratory building in 1934. When construction finished in 1935, the facility was initially called the Fort Monmouth Signal Laboratory until the War Department designated the building as the Squier Signal Laboratory in 1945 in honor of Major General George Owen Squier, founder of the SCL and Chief Signal Officer during World War I. The facility would later be redesignated as Squier Hall in 1955.

During 1934 and 1935, tests of microwave RPF equipment resulted in Doppler-shifted signals being obtained, initially at only a few hundred feet distance and later over several miles. These tests involved a bi-static arrangement, with the transmitter at one end of the line of transmission and the receiver at the other, and the reflecting target passing through or near the path. The development state of this Doppler-beat detector was summarized by Blair in 1935:
To date the distances at which reflected signals can be detected with radio-optical equipment are not great enough to be of value. However, with improvements in the radiated power of the transmitter and sensitivity of the receiver, this method of position finding may well reach a state of usefulness.
In an internal report, Blair noted that the SCL might investigate another technique: 
Consideration is now being given to the scheme of projecting an interrupted sequence of trains of oscillations against the target and attempting to detect the echoes during the interstices between the projections.

Radio position finding
In 1936, a small project in pulsed microwave transmission was started by W. Delmar Hershberger. The SCL called this technique radio position-finding (RPF). Lacking success with microwaves, Hershberger visited the NRL (where he had earlier worked) and saw their 200-MHz pulsed set. Back at the SCL, he and Robert H. Noyes built an experimental set with a 110-MHz (2.73-m) pulsed transmitter and a receiver patterned on the one at the NRL. A request for project funding was turned down by the War Department, but, with the backing of the Chief Signal Officer, Maj. Gen. James B. Allison, $75,000 for support was diverted from a previous appropriation for a communication project.

In October 1936, Paul E. Watson (later Lt. Colonel) became the SCL Chief Engineer and led the project. A field setup near the coast was made with the transmitter and receiver separated by a mile. On December 14, the experimental set detected at up to  range aircraft flying in and out of New York City.

Development of a prototype system followed, with Captain Rex Corput as the Project Officer. Ralph I. Cole headed receiver work and William S. Marks led transmitter improvements. Separate antennas and receivers were used for azimuth and elevation measurements. These receiving antennas, plus the transmitting antenna, were made of large arrays of dipole wires on wooden frames. The system output was used to aim a searchlight.

The first demonstration of the full set was made on the night of May 26, 1937. An unlighted bomber was detected and then illuminated by the searchlight. The observers included the Secretary of War, Henry A. Woodring; he was so impressed that the next day orders were given for the full development of the system.

With strong support from General Allison, a special Congressional appropriation of $250,000 was obtained. The frequency was increased to 200 MHz (1.5 m). The transmitter used 16 tubes in a ring oscillator circuit (developed at the NRL), producing about 75-kW peak power. Colton wanted lobe switching for the receiving antennas, and Major James C. Moore was assigned to head the resulting complex electrical and mechanical design.  Engineers from Western Electric and Westinghouse were brought in to assist in the overall development.

First fielded Army systems
For better security and more space, the RPF activities were moved to Fort Hancock, New Jersey. This was an isolated location on Sandy Hook, a sandbar peninsula reaching into the New York Harbor. During 1938, Blair's health failed, and the position of SCL Director was taken over by Roger Colton, who was then promoted to Colonel. (After succeeding Blair as the Director of the SCL, Colton remained until September 1944, when he transferred to the Army Air Forces. He was awarded the Legion of Merit and the Distinguished Service Medal for his work at the SCL.)

Colton arranged for the demonstration of a prototype system in late November 1938. The system was designated SCR-268, with SCR meaning either Set Complete Radio or Signal Corps Radio used interchangeably in documents. The SCR-268 was primarily intended for aiming searchlights associated with anti-aircraft guns; the system allowed coarse pointing of a thermal infrared detector, and this then aimed the searchlight. The night demonstration was for the Coast Artillery Board and was conducted at Fort Monroe, just off the coast near Hampton, Virginia.

This was almost a failure because the target, a Martin B-10 bomber at  altitude, was blown off course and flew miles out over the Atlantic. After a long return flight, it came above an opening in the clouds and, to the delight of the observers, was immediately illuminated by the radar-directed searchlight.

Production of SCR-268 sets was started by Western Electric in 1939, and it entered service in early 1941; about 3,100 sets were eventually built. Later, the plan position indicator (PPI) was added and the system was designated SCR-516, a low-altitude early-warning radar.

Another observer at the May 1937 test was Brig. Gen. Henry H. Arnold, then Assistant Chief of Staff of the Army Air Corps. This led to a request from the Air Corps for a simpler, longer-range, early-warning system. In parallel with the completion of the SCR-268, a new project led by Major, later Lieutenant Colonel, (Dr.) Harold A. Zahl got underway.  Good funding and a high priority were received; thus, development was quickly completed.

This new system operated at 106 MHz (2.83 m) and had simplifications of the antenna, elimination of lobe-switching, and the addition of a duplexer developed by Zahl. Overall, there was a sacrifice in accuracy, but thus was balanced by ease in maintenance and greater range (up to 240 miles).

There were two configurations – the SCR-270 (mobile) and the SCR-271 (fixed-site). Westinghouse received the production contract, and started deliveries near the end of 1940. An SCR-270 was in service near the island of Oahu on the morning of December 7, 1941. At 7:20, the operators reported detecting a flight of planes due north, but the Duty Officer dismissed it as "nothing unusual" and the alarm went unheeded. At 7:59, the Japanese hit Pearl Harbor.

Taking over an earlier project of the NRL, the Laboratory developed the SCR-518 radar altimeter for the Army Air Forces. Operating at 518 MHz (0.579 m), this system was produced by RCA starting in 1940. The Laboratory was also involved in an early version of a portable, radar-based instrument landing system, eventually designated the SCS-51.

Creation of field laboratories

During 1940 and 1941, the Signal Corps established three field laboratories near Fort Monmouth to supplement the expanding research efforts of the SCL.

Field Laboratory Number One, which became known as Camp Coles in 1942, was situated west of Red Bank, New Jersey and was tasked with the development of radio equipment. The 46-acre site was named in honor of Colonel Ray Howard Coles, assistant to the Chief Signal Officer during World War I. Camp Coles was redesignated as Coles Signal Laboratory in 1945 and then as Coles Area in 1956. Field Laboratory Number Two, later designated as the Eatontown Signal Laboratory due to its proximity to Eatontown, New Jersey, served as a location where Signal Corps researchers worked on wire, direction-finding, sound-and-light, and meteorological projects. Field Laboratory Number Three initially resided at Fort Hancock as the Signal Corps Radar Laboratory until it was relocated to Camp Evans in 1942. Due to secretive nature of the research and confusion over the sanction of the word “radar,” the War Department shortly redesignated the Signal Corps Radar Laboratory as the Camp Evans Signal Laboratory. Evans Signal Laboratory included the original facility of the Marconi Belmont Station, and a central building commonly called the Marconi Hotel became the headquarters. Outdoor testing of hardware was often done at Twin Lights, a lighthouse station between Camp Evans and Fort Hancock, New Jersey.

In mid-1940, the British and American governments made the decision to exchange information on their defense technologies and enter into shared developments. The Tizard Mission initiated this exchange, bringing to America their most secret items. Among these was the cavity magnetron. This high-power generator of microwave signals was immediately seen as the solution to further developments in radar. Before the end of the year, the Radiation Laboratory (commonly called the Rad Lab) was established in facilities at MIT with the primary purpose of consolidating development of microwave radar.

The name radar came from the acronym RADAR, coined by the U.S. Navy in 1940 as a cover for their secret activities in Radio Detection And Ranging. The name was soon adopted by the U.S. Army, replacing Radio Position Finding (RPF), and by the British, replacing Radio Detection and Finding (RDF).

One of the first projects at the Rad Lab was the development of a mobile microwave gun- laying (aiming) radar for use with anti-aircraft (AA) guns. In May 1941, the preliminary system was completed and a demonstration was given to now Brig. General Roger B. Colton, Chief of Research and Engineering at the SCL. He promised Army support for the final development and recommended procuring a set for every AA battery.

In close cooperation with the SCL, representing the eventual user of the system, the Rad Lab developed an engineering model of the GL system. Designated XT-1, this was carried in four trucks, including a large power generator. To provide automatic target tracking, the Bell Telephone Laboratories (BTL) developed an electronic analog computer containing 160 vacuum tubes.

Preliminary  testing of the full GL system, now designated the SCR-584, was conducted by the SCL at Fort Monmouth in December 1941. It was eventually placed into production by General Electric and Westinghouse as prime contractors. About 1,500 of these systems were used in both the European and Pacific war theaters. The SCR-584 is largely credited with enabling anti-aircraft guns to destroy most of German V-1 flying bombs attacking London following the Normandy invasion.

Wartime radars

Although the SCL initiated its radar research using microwaves, it never returned to developing sets in this wavelength region. The Evans Signal Laboratory did, however, push the frequencies higher, primarily through Harold Zahl's development in 1939 of the VT-158, a tube generating 240-kW pulse-power at up to 600 MHz (0.5 m). This was actually four triodes and their associated circuit tightly packaged in one glass envelope.

Following the surprise bombing of Pearl Harbor, there was a crash program to obtain radars to protect the Panama Canal Zone from a similar attack. Captain John W. Marchetti led a 20-person team in using the VT-158 to adapt SCR-268s for this application. The special project was completed in a few weeks.

Marchetti's team then went on to convert this into the AN/TPS-3, a light-weight, transportable system and the last major radar fully developed by the SCL. The set could be assembled and placed into operation by a small crew in 30 minutes. During the war, the AN/TPS-3 was used for early warning at beachheads, isolated areas, and captured air bases. A version, AN/TQS-3, was developed for locating mortars. Zenith manufactured about 900 total of both versions. After the war, Marchetti became the first director of the Air Force Cambridge Research Center in Massachusetts.

In March 1942, the U.S. Army was reorganized into three components: Ground Forces, Air Forces, and Service Forces. The Signal Corps was in the Service Forces. At this time, the SCL officially became the Signal Corps General Services. The operations remained at Camp Evans, and, for most purposes, continued to be referred to as the SCL or the Camp Evans Signals Laboratory. During the war years, the overall operations of the Signal Corps at Fort Monmouth about 14,000 personnel.

Most of the radar projects at the SCL were in association with the Rad Lab, primarily in transferring prototypes from the research state to rugged hardware for field use. Essentially all manufacturing was performed by commercial firms. A few of the many such systems will be noted.

The SCR-582 was an early 10-cm radar developed for the SCL by the Rad Lab. Primarily intended as a harbor-defense system, it had a 48-inch parabolic dish and was usually mounted atop a  tower. The SCR-682 was a transportable version.

The SCL was responsible for a number of other 10-cm radars used by the Army. The AN/CPS-4, nicknamed "Beaver Tail" from the shape of its beam, was a height finder set from the Rad Lab; it was used with the SCR-270 and SCR-271. The BTL developed the AN/CPS-5, a ground-controlled interception radar that could track targets at more than  distance.

Representative SCL mobile-ground radars included the AN/GPN-2, a search set with a  range produced by Bendix Corporation, and the AN/GPN-6, a similar search set from the Laboratory for Electronics Inc. The AN/CPN-18, also made by Bendix, was the secondary surveillance radar portion of an air-traffic control system used by the Army Air Forces.

Post-World War II

In February 1945, authority over the Eatontown Signal Laboratory was transferred from the Chief Signal Officer to the Commanding General of the Army Air Forces. During this transition, the Eatontown Signal Laboratory was renamed Watson Laboratories in honor of Lt. Colonel Paul E. Watson. The facility would later move to Rome, New York in 1951 under the authority of the U.S. Air Force where it became the Rome Air Development Center.

By this point, the Coles Signal Laboratory, the Evans Signal Laboratory, the Watson Laboratories, and the Squier Signal Laboratory became known collectively as the Signal Corps Engineering Laboratories. The most research that took place at these laboratory sites pertained to communication systems, radar, electron tube research, and component improvement as well as meteorology, proximity fuses, and photography.

The United States conducted Project Paperclip, under which a number of German scientists and engineers were brought to America to work in defense research. Twenty-four of these specialists were hired by the ESL where they made significant contributions to future radars and other electronics developments. In late 1945, Project Diana was started at the ESL. Using a modified SCR-271 radar with a special antenna, attempts were made receive a signal bounced off of the Moon. On January 10, 1946, this was successful, with the reflected signal received 2.5 seconds after it was transmitted. This demonstrated the potential of radio communications beyond the Earth for space probes and human explorers. In 1946, the ESL developed the MPQ-10, an automatic counter-battery radar. Two years later, this was followed by the Army's first weather radar. 

In 1954, the Signal Corps moved the operations of the Watson Laboratories as well as the Coles, Evans, and Squier Signal Laboratories to a newly constructed building at Fort Monmouth to centralize the work conducted by the Signal Corps Engineering Laboratories. Located in Camp Charles Woods, the new building was named the Albert J. Myer Center in honor of the first Chief Signal Officer of the U.S. Army Signal Corps but was commonly referred to as the Hexagon due to its unique shape.

In the late 1950s, the ESL developed the solar cell batteries that would help to power the U.S. satellite Vanguard 1C for years after the chemical batteries had died. The solar cells and their application on the Vanguard project were a major innovation that would influence the powering of future U.S. satellites.

In 1958, the Signal Corps Engineering Laboratories was redesignated by the Army as the U.S. Army Signal Corps Research and Development Laboratory (ASCRDL), which was also referred to as the Signal Research and Development Laboratory. In that same year, the ASCRDL created the Institute for Exploratory Research as a result of increased emphasis placed on internal research.

Closure 
In 1962, the U.S. Army went through a dramatic reorganization of its internal structure in response to a study directed by the Secretary of Defense. In order to reduce costs as well as overlap in research efforts, much of the material development work conducted by the Signal Corps at Fort Monmouth was transferred to the Army Materiel Command’s new subordinate element, the U.S. Army Electronics Command (ECOM), later the U.S. Army Electronics and Communications Command (ECCOM). By August 1, 1962, Fort Monmouth was no longer a Signal Corps installation.

With the Signal Corps Laboratories abolished, the ASCRDL was renamed the U.S. Army Electronics Research and Development Laboratory. By 1964, the organization was renamed the U.S. Army Electronics Laboratories. But due to major organizational changes within ECOM, the Army Electronics Laboratories was soon discontinued on June 1, 1965. The organization was then broken up into six separate Army laboratories: the Electronic Components Laboratory (which later became the Electronics Technology and Devices Laboratory), the Communications/ADP Laboratory, the Atmospheric Sciences Laboratory, the Electronic Warfare Laboratory (part of which later became the Vulnerability Assessment Laboratory), the Avionics Laboratory, and the Combat Surveillance and Target Acquisition Laboratory.

After 80 years as the center of the Army's communications and electronics development, the 2005 DoD Base Realignment and Closure (BRAC) directed that these activities be transferred elsewhere and Fort Monmouth be closed by 2011.

References

General references

Brown, Louis; A Radar History of World War II - Technical and Military Imperatives, Inst. of Physics Pub., 1999
Skolnik, Merrill I.; "Fifty Years of Radar," Proc IEEE, Special Issue on Radar, Vol. 73, p. 182, 1985
Terrett, Dulany; The Signal Corps: The Emergency (to December 1941), 4th ed., Government Printing Office, 2002
Vieweger A. L.; "Radar in the Signal Corps," IRE Trans Mil. Elect., MIL-4, p. 555, Oct. 1960
Watson, Raymond C., Jr.; Radar Origins Worldwide, Trafford Publications, 2009
Zale, Harold; Electronics Away, 1969, and Radar Spelled Backwards, 1972, Vantage Press

External links
Staff of the CECOM LCMC Historical Office; "A Concise History of Fort Monmouth, New Jersey, and the U. S. Army CECOM Life Cycle Management Command," 2009; https://web.archive.org/web/20150322103943/http://cecom.army.mil/historian/pubupdates/FM%20History%20Book%2009_4Web.pdf
Goebel, Gregory V.; "The Wizard War: WW2 & The Origins of Radar," a book-length document; http://www.vectorsite.net/ttwiz.html
"Radar: A Report on Science at War," Office of Scientific Research and Development, distributed by Office of War Information, 15 Aug. 1945; http://www.ibiblio.org/hyperwar/USN/ref/Radar-OSRD/index.html
Radar Station B-71; http://lcweb2.loc.gov/master/pnp/habshaer/ca/ca3400/ca3427/data/ca3427data.pdf
Colton, R.B.; "Radar in the United States Army History and Early Development at the Signal Corps Laboratories, Fort Monmouth, N.J.," https://ieeexplore.ieee.org/abstract/document/1696725

Research installations of the United States Army
Signal units and formations of the United States Army
Radar
Recipients of the Legion of Merit
1930 establishments in New Jersey